Five Nights at Freddy's: Special Delivery is a 2019 augmented reality survival horror video game developed and published by Illumix for Android and iOS. It is the third spin-off in the Five Nights at Freddy's series and the tenth game overall.  The game, which presents itself as an animatronic rental service created by the in-universe company Fazbear Entertainment, takes inspiration from the history of Five Nights at Freddy's across all media, and continues the storyline established in Five Nights at Freddy's: Help Wanted, bridging the gap between it and its sequel, Five Nights at Freddy's: Security Breach, released in 2021.

Gameplay is presented from the first-person perspective with a primary focus on the player's flashlight and controlled shocker. The player can freely move around their home, interacting with the animatronics, and unlocking new animatronics and skins by defeating them. Outside the main game, the player is able to salvage animatronics for parts, and can also send their own animatronics to their friends' homes. Combat focuses on finding static based on where the animatronic is, and giving them a controlled shock when they charge at the player.

Development of Special Delivery, the first game by Illumix, began in 2018 and took little over a year. The game was first announced in August 2018, and was first released in early access on November 22, 2019, with a full release three days later, on November 25. The game received generally positive reviews from critics, with praise directed at its combat, narrative, content, voice performance and original soundtrack.

Gameplay 
The game features location-based augmented reality gameplay, similar to Pokémon Go. Numerous malfunctioning animatronics are sent to the player's home, which the player has to survive from. The player has numerous tools at their aid, including a flashlight and a controlled shocker. The player can also salvage animatronics for parts and send their own animatronics to their friends' homes. The game receives continuous updates adding new characters, skins for the animatronics, and new gameplay features.

Plot 
It begins with a simple premise—signing up for the Fazbear Funtime Service so that "you'll never be alone again". But as the story begins to unfold, players will realize that they may have signed up for more than they bargained for. Malfunctioning animatronics are delivered to their doorsteps for a series of frightening encounters. The inbox provides many tips for dealing with this, as well as some emails, not meant to be sent to the player. 

One series of emails tells the story of a man named Luis trying to inform a woman, Ness, about red-flag reports triggered by her harmful and offensive search words. The emails eventually reveal that she is under the control of William Afton, one of Fazbear Entertainment's co-founders and secretly a child serial killer, who was presumed to have died in a fire several years ago, and that Ness is Vanny from Five Nights at Freddy's: Help Wanted ("Ness" being short for Vanny's real name "Vanessa"), who was possessed by Afton after encountering a digital form of him while play-testing one of Fazbear's products. Another series of emails tells the story of the employees at Fazbear Entertainment scanning the circuit boards of old animatronics for "The Freddy Fazbear Virtual Experience".

Development 
Five Nights at Freddy's: Special Delivery was developed and published by Illumix for Android and iOS. It is smaller in  size and scope than the previous Five Nights at Freddy's games. It has been compared to Ultimate Custom Night, a game which served as a standalone expansion that has been compared to Freddy Fazbear's Pizzeria Simulator.

Music 
Leon Riskin returned to compose the musical score for Five Nights at Freddy's: Special Delivery after composing Five Nights at Freddy's: Sister Location, Freddy Fazbear's Pizzeria Simulator, Ultimate Custom Night, and Five Nights at Freddy's: Help Wanted.

Release 
The game was announced in August 2018 when Scott Cawthon said that he made a deal with an integrated gaming and technology studio transforming the future of mixed reality gaming, stating that "The game is well under way, and while I'm not going to reveal any gameplay details yet, I will say that the impending doom of something hunting you will keep you up at night." The development team was later revealed to be California-based Illumix, On September 6, 2019, a teaser trailer was uploaded for the game to Illumix's YouTube channel, followed by an announcement trailer one week later on September 13, revealing the title. The game was first released for early access on November 22, 2019 for Android and iOS, and was later officially released on November 25, 2019. The release included a trailer featuring Markiplier, a popular YouTuber well known for his various gameplays of the Five Nights at Freddy's series.

Tie-in media and merchandise 
In January 2021, Funko released a Freddy Frostbear action figure and Freddy Frostbear plush exclusively for Walmart. In March 2021, Funko released Chocolate Freddy, Chocolate Bonnie, and Chocolate Chica action figures. An Easter Bonnie action figure and Chocolate Bonnie plush were released exclusively for Walmart.

Downloadable content 
Dark Circus: Encore! was released on December 13, 2021, and has the player sent into a mixed-reality environment where they can freely move around the area by tapping on their screen to move forward. The player is tasked with solving puzzles while on a time limit. Machines with clocks ticking down are strewn throughout the circus, with the players having to search around for clues to solve them. As more tasks are completed, the chained up animatronics are slowly unbound, leading to battles against them in the traditional AR playstyle. The characters include Ringmaster Foxy, Ballora, and Great Escape Golden Freddy.

Reception 
The game received generally positive reviews from critics, who praised it for its combat, narrative, content, voice performance and original soundtrack.

References

External links 

 
 
 

2019 video games
Android (operating system) games
Augmented reality games
Special Delivery
2010s horror video games
IOS games
Single-player video games
Video games about robots
Video games developed in the United States
Video games set in 2020
Video games set in Utah
Video games set in the United States